Neon Museum, also the Museum of Neon is a museum located in Warsaw's Praga-Południe. The institution documents and protects Polish and Eastern Bloc light advertisements created after World War II. It is the first in Poland and one of the few museums of neon signs in the world.

The museum is located at ul. Mińska 25, on the premises of Soho Factory. It was established in 2012.

History 
The history of the museum began in 2005 when Ilona Karwińska saved the Berlin neon sign from Marszałkowska Street in Warsaw. The collection of the museum features about 100 neon lights from all over Poland
 Most of the neons come from the 1960s and 1970s.

The nine largest neon signs including GŁÓWNA KSIĘGARNIA TECHNICZNA (MAIN TECHNICAL BOOKSTORE), Jubiler, dworzec kolejowy CHODZIEŻ (CHODZIEŻ railway station), KINO PRAHA (PRAHA cinema) and WARSZAWA WSCHODNIA are located on different Soho Factory buildings. The museum also looks after some neon signs in Warsaw, including Mermaid on Grójecka Street.

The museum has a large archive containing blueprints, photographs and original plans.

In 2013, the museum together with RWE organized Neon for Warsaw competition.

Gallery

References

External links

 Official website of the Museum

Museums in Warsaw
Praga-Północ
Museums established in 2012
Neon lighting
Signage
2012 establishments in Poland